Lärjedalen is in the south of the former municipality Angered; it gets its name from the river Lärjeån that crosses the municipality.

Great parts of Lärjedalen are natural reserves.

The "center" of Lärjedalen is the suburb Hjällbo.

Boroughs of Gothenburg